Frankley Reservoir is a semi-circular reservoir for drinking water in Birmingham, England, operated by Severn Trent Water. Its construction was authorised by the Birmingham Corporation Water Act of 1892. It was built by Birmingham Corporation Water Department to designs by Abram Kellett of Ealing in 1904.

In that year ground-penetrating radar was used successfully to isolate the leaks.

See also
List of reservoirs and dams in the United Kingdom
Frankley Water Treatment Works

References

External links 
History

Drinking water reservoirs in England
Reservoirs in Birmingham, West Midlands